The 1979-80 Cleveland Cavaliers season was the tenth season of the franchise in the National Basketball Association (NBA).

Key Dates

Offseason

Free Agents

Trades

Draft picks

Roster

Regular season

Season standings

Record vs. opponents

Game log

|-style="background:#fcc;"
| 7 || October 23, 1979 || Atlanta
| L 111–121
|
|
|
| Coliseum at Richfield3,946
| 2–5
|-style="background:#fcc;"
| 8 || October 24, 1979 || @ Atlanta
| L 118–128
|
|
|
| The Omni5,729
| 2–6

|-style="background:#cfc;"
| 28 || December 2, 1979 || Atlanta
| W 126–108
|
|
|
| Coliseum at Richfield4,844
| 12–16

|-style="background:#fcc;"
| 44 || January 9, 1980 || @ Atlanta
| L 107–111
|
|
|
| The Omni7,589
| 19–25

|-style="background:#fcc;"
| 68 || February 29, 1980 || @ Atlanta
| L 103–111 (OT)
|
|
|
| The Omni11,655
| 26–42

|-style="background:#cfc;"
| 82 || March 30, 1980 || Atlanta
| W 111–102
|
|
|
| Coliseum at Richfield7,762
| 37–45

Player stats
Note: GP= Games played; GS = Games started; MIN= Minutes; FG% = field goal %, FT% = free throw %, 3FG% = 3 point % STL= Steals; BLK = Blocks; AST = Assists; REB = Rebounds; PTS = Points

Regular Season

Playoffs

Awards and records

Awards
 Austin Carr, J. Walter Kennedy Citizenship Award

Records

Milestones

All-Star

Transactions

Trades

Free Agents

References

Cleveland Cavaliers seasons
Cleveland Cavaliers
Cleveland Cavaliers
Cle